Ravinder Grewal (born 28 March 1963) is an Indian singer and actor. He has produced a Punjabi-language film, Raula Pai Gaya, through his own production house. In 2015, he featured in the legal comedy Judge Singh LLB. His most popular songs include "Lovely V/s PU" and "Jatt Karjai", lyrics of both are penned by Preet Sanghreri.

Filmography
 Nikka Zaildar 2 (2017)
 Judge Singh LLB (2015)
 Yaar Velly (2014)
 Phir Raula Pai Gaya 2008
 Raula Pai Gaya (2012)
 Danger Doctor Jelly (2017)
 15 Lakh Kado Aauga (2019)
 Gidarh Singhi (2019)

Personal life
Grewal comes from Gujjarwal village in Ludhiana district of Punjab.

References

Male actors from Punjab, India
Living people
1979 births
People from Ludhiana district
Male actors in Punjabi cinema
21st-century Indian male actors
Singers from Punjab, India
21st-century Indian singers
21st-century Indian male singers